Coagulin is a gel-forming protein of hemolymph that hinders the spread of invaders by immobilising them. It is produced in the coagulogen form before being cleaved into the active form. In human medicine, coagulation of coagulin is the basis of detection of bacterial endotoxin in the LAL test for parenteral medications.

The protein contains a single 175-residue polypeptide chain that is cleaved after Arg-18 and Arg-46 by a Limulus clotting enzyme contained in the hemocyte and activated by a bacterial endotoxin (lipopolysaccharide). Cleavage releases two chains of coagulin, A and B, linked by two disulfide bonds, together with the peptide C. Gel formation results from interlinking of coagulin molecules. The full-length structure of a coagulogen is known; it shares the same cystine-knot cytokine superfamily (fold) as neurotrophins, with several cystines conserved. The A-B fold wraps around the helical peptide C, forming a compact structure.

In crustaceans, hemolymph coagulation depends on the transglutaminase-mediated cross-linking of specific plasma-clotting proteins, but without the proteolytic cascade. In horseshoe crabs, the proteolytic coagulation cascade triggered by lipopolysaccharides and beta-1,3-glucans leads to the conversion of coagulogen into coagulin, resulting in noncovalent coagulin homopolymers through head-to-tail interaction. However, horseshoe crab transglutaminase does not cross-link coagulins intermolecularly. Recently, coagulins were discovered to be cross-linked on hemocyte cell surface proteins called proxins. This indicates that a cross-linking reaction at the final stage of hemolymph coagulation is an important innate immune system of horseshoe crabs. In comparison, mammalian blood coagulation is based on the proteolytically induced polymerization of fibrinogens. Initially, fibrin monomers noncovalently interact with each other. The resulting homopolymers are further stabilized when the plasma transglutaminase cross-links  bonds between molecules.

References

Protein domains